Saiful Azli bin Abdul Rahman (born 20 August 1977) is a Malaysian field hockey player. He competed in the men's tournament at the 2000 Summer Olympics.

References

External links
 

1977 births
Living people
Malaysian male field hockey players
Olympic field hockey players of Malaysia
Field hockey players at the 2000 Summer Olympics
Place of birth missing (living people)